Coordination may refer to:
 Coordination (linguistics), a compound grammatical construction
 Coordination complex, consisting of a central atom or ion and a surrounding array of bound molecules or ions
 Coordination number or ligancy of a central atom in a molecule or crystal is the number of atoms, molecules or ions bonded to it
 Language coordination, the tendency of people to mimic the language of others
 Coordination (political culture), a Utopian form of political regime
 Motor coordination, in animal motion
 A chemical reaction to form a coordination complex
 Gleichschaltung the process of Nazification in Germany after 1933, often translated as "coordination"

See also
 Coordinate (disambiguation)
 Coordinator (disambiguation)